SN 2003gd was a Type II-P supernova explosion in the spiral galaxy Messier 74, located in the constellation
Pisces. SN 2003gd was discovered on 12 June 2003 by Robert Evans, using a 0.31m reflector, and its discovery was confirmed on 13 June 2003 by R. H. McNaught using the 1.0m telescope at the 
Siding Spring Observatory.

It was discovered at the end of its "plateau phase", approximately 86 days after its estimated explosion date of 18 March 2003. Despite of a lower tail luminosity in the light curve, this appears to be a normal Type II-p. A light echo from nearby dust was detected in archival images from 2004.

Messier 74 had been observed approximately 200 days before the explosion with the Hubble Space Telescope, and about 300 days before using the Gemini Telescope. Astronomers were able to identify an object in these pre-supernova images that was in the same position as SN 2003gd, and which is believed to be the supernova's  progenitor star. It is the first progenitor of a normal type II-P supernova to have ever been detected.

References

External links
 Light curves and spectra on the Open Supernova Catalog
 Image of SN 2003gd
 Entry for SN 2003gd in the SIMBAD database

Supernovae
Supernova remnants
Pisces (constellation)
20030612